Eritrean may refer to:
 Something of, from, or related to the country of Eritrea
 A person from Eritrea, or of Eritrean descent. For information about the Eritrean people, see Demographics of Eritrea and Culture of Eritrea. For specific persons, see List of Eritreans.
 Languages of Eritrea, several, but none called "Eritrean"
 Eritrean cuisine, a fusion of Eritrea's native culinary traditions and social interchanges with other regions
 Eritrean coastal desert, ecoregion is a harsh sand and gravel strip along the southern part of the coast of Eritrea and the Red Sea coast of Djibouti
 Eritrean literature, works in Tigrinya language

See also 
 
 Eritrea (disambiguation)

Language and nationality disambiguation pages